Lai da Rims (German: Rimsersee) is a lake in Val Müstair, Grisons, Switzerland. The surface area of  has an elevation of 2396 m. It is the largest lake in the Rom basin, which makes it also the largest lake in the Swiss portion of the Adige basin. 

It is not to be confused with Lais da Rims, a set of tarn lakes in the Sesvenna Range near S-charl.

Geography  
Lake is located south-east of the Swiss National Park in the Ortler group
Southeast above the lake is the Piz Umbrail, which is already on the border with Italy.

See also
List of mountain lakes of Switzerland
Hydrology of Switzerland

References 

Lakes of Switzerland
Lakes of Graubünden
Val Müstair